Saint-Gratien ("Saint Gratian") may refer to the following locales in France:

Saint-Gratien, Somme
Saint-Gratien, Val-d'Oise
Saint-Gratien (Paris RER), a railway station in  Saint-Gratien, Val-d'Oise
Saint-Gratien-Savigny, in the Nièvre département